Komal Sharma is an Indian actress, model, National Squash Player. She won the title Miss Metropolis 2011. She won the best actor award from American Film Festival 2018. She Acted with Mohanlal in Marakkar: Lion of the Arabian Sea.

She also acted in Bollywood Hungama 2 which is directed by Priyadarshan and "Public " with Samuthirakani which is directed by Raa Paraman.

Early life
Komal Sharma was born in Chennai, Tamil Nadu India to  North Indian parents. She is the youngest of four siblings. Graduated in Bachelor of Computer Applications (BCA) from Sri Kanyaka Parameswari Arts and Science College for Women, Chennai. She earned her Honorary Doctorate in 2018.

Career

Beauty pageants
She won the title Miss Metropolis 2011 and continued winning pageants like Miss Tamil Nadu, Miss Beautiful Skin of Tamil Nadu, Miss Beautiful Skin of South India, Fresh Face of South India, twice crowned as Miss Tamil Nadu in two different event.

Sports
Komal got interest on Squash from her school days. She joined the Squash Racquets Federation of India (SRFI) and won several junior and senior National Squash championships. She represented Tamil Nadu several times in national level tournaments and won the medals.

Acting career
In 2013, she was offered a role in S. A. Chandrasekhar's Sattapadi Kutram. Before its release, she completed Oothari, directed by Shakti Krishna. After the release of her debut film Sattapadi Kutram, she taken the films seriously and carefully chosen the roles. Komal acted in Nagaraja Cholan MA, MLA, the sequel to Amaidhi Padai. directed by Manivannan.

Sharma played the titular role in Telugu film Anu, directed and produced by Sunil Kumar. It is Komal's Telugu debut. Later appeared 
in Tamil film Vaigai Express directed by director Shaji Kailash. Natrinai is a Tamil movie directed and produced by director Gautham Elangovan. 

She debuted to Malayalam film in Marakkar: Lion of the Arabian Sea, directed by director Priyadarshan. In Marakkar she is paired opposite to actor Arjun Sarja. Her second Malayalam film Ittymaani: Made in China released before Marakkar and movie went was commercially successful. She won best actress award at chilli International film festival for her movie Security short film directed by director Udhaya Alagappan.
  
Komal's next in Tamil film is Shot Boot 3 directed by Director Arunachalam  Vaidhyanathan. She has finished another untitled Tamil movie Director Samuthirakani is doing a titular role in this.

Advertisements
Komal featured in more than 150 print and television commercials nationally and Internationally. Komal appeared in various dance shows internationally.

Filmography

References

Mohanlal sir explained the meaning of Jimikki Kammal to me: Komal Sharma | Tamil Movie News - Times of India
https://timesofindia.indiatimes.com/entertainment/tamil/movies/news/mohanlal-sir-explained-the-meaning-of-jimikki-kammal-to-me-komal-sharma/articleshow/74813396.cms

External links
 Vimeo
 

Indian film actresses
Actresses in Tamil cinema
Female models from Chennai
Sportswomen from Tamil Nadu
Indian female squash players
Actresses from Chennai
Living people
Racket sportspeople from Chennai
Year of birth missing (living people)
21st-century Indian actresses
Actresses in Malayalam cinema